Epithelial-myoepithelial carcinoma (EMCa) is a rare malignant tumour that typically arises in a salivary gland and consists of both an epithelial and myoepithelial component.  They are predominantly found in the parotid gland
and represent approximately 1% of salivary gland tumours.

Cause

Diagnosis
EMCas are diagnosed by examination of tissue, e.g. a biopsy.

This tumour is characterised by biphasic tubular structures composed of inner ductal and outer clear myoepithelial cells.

Its appearance is very similar to adenomyoepithelioma of the breast, which may be the same tumour at a different anatomical site.

The histologic differential diagnosis includes adenoid cystic carcinoma and pleomorphic adenoma.

Prognosis
They generally have a good prognosis. In one larger study, the 5-year and 10-year survival were over 90% and 80% respectively.

See also 
Epithelial-myoepithelial carcinoma of the lung
Adenomyoepithelioma

References 

Rare cancers
Salivary gland neoplasia